Wendy Elizabeth Byrne (born 1957) is a Canadian lawyer and politician from Ottawa, Ontario. She is a former Ottawa-Carleton Regional Councillor.

Byrne ran for political office twice in 1997. In June of that year, she ran for the New Democratic Party in the riding of Ottawa West—Nepean, but only received 7.6% of the vote. In November however, she was elected in the Ottawa-Carleton regional elections in the seat of Bay Ward. She ran on a platform of preserving green space, opposing downloading taxes to property owners and opposed the expansion of the Champlain Bridge. She also supported the preservation of non-profit housing and a transit strategy of smaller buses and light rail. She had defeated her closest rival by less than 200 votes in close 4-way race. While on council, she served as vice-chair of the region's Community Services Committee and as a member of the Regional Transit Commission. She served just one term, as the Region was abolished upon the amalgamation of Ottawa in 2000.

Byrne was the Ontario New Democratic Party candidate in Ottawa West—Nepean for the 2011 provincial election.
 Byrne received 14.8% of the vote, an increase of 6.3% over the previous by-election results in 2010.

Before being elected, Byrne was a community organizer and was a director and vice president at a credit union. She practised law in Ottawa, Ontario from 1995 to 1997 and from 2000 to 2008 and 2011 to 2016, and practised law in Calgary, Alberta from 2008 to 2011. Byrne now resides in Victoria, British Columbia where she works for the Government of British Columbia.

Electoral record

References

Living people
New Democratic Party candidates for the Canadian House of Commons
Ontario New Democratic Party candidates in Ontario provincial elections
Lawyers in Ontario
University of Ottawa alumni
Politicians from Toronto
Ottawa-Carleton regional councillors
Women municipal councillors in Canada
Canadian women lawyers
20th-century Canadian women politicians
1957 births